Józef Pokorski (10 August 1922 – 29 July 1980) was a Polish footballer who played as a goalkeeper. As it is currently known, Pokorski is the highest goal scoring Polish goalkeeper.

Biography
Józef Pokorski is known to have started playing with RKS Hajduki, most likely in their youth sides before joining Kresy Chorzów and playing with the club during the outbreak of World War II. After the war he returned back to Kresy Chorzów before shortly moving to Lechia Gdańsk. At Lechia he became well known for his penalty taking abilities and scored 5 penalties in playoffs for Lechia. He was among the team in their first ever season in the I liga. With Lechia he made 50 appearances and scored 5 goals in all competitions. After Lechia he had a short spell with Górnik Katowice before returning to the I liga with Lech Poznań, making a further 7 appearances in Poland's top division. After Lech he had spells with Górnik Katowice, Gwardia Słupsk and KS Chełmek before retiring in 1956.

See also
List of goalscoring goalkeepers

References

Lechia Gdańsk players
Lech Poznań players
Polish footballers
Association football goalkeepers
1922 births
1980 deaths